Messenian Oinousses ( Messiniakés Inoússes) is a Greek island complex in the southwest coasts of Peloponnese, in Ionian Sea. It is located in the south of Messenian peninsula, opposite Methoni and Foinikounda. The complex comprises from the islands Schiza and Sapientza and the islets and rocks Venetiko, Agia Mariani, Avgo, Dyo Aderfia and Boba. The largest island is Schiza, whereas the only populated is Sapientza. In the southwest of Oinousses is the deepest point of Mediterranean Sea, the Calypso Deep, known in Greek as Oinousses Trench. Oinousses has been included in the environmental program Natura 2000. The islands belong to Pylos-Nestor municipality.

Main islands

See also
Calypso Deep

References

Archipelagoes of Greece
Landforms of Messenia
Ionian Islands